Maurice Lamar Leggett (also known as Moe Leggett) (born October 2, 1986) is an American football cornerback who is currently a free agent. He was previously a member of the Kansas City Chiefs of the National Football League and the Winnipeg Blue Bombers of the Canadian Football League (CFL). He entered the NFL as an undrafted free agent in May 2008. He played college football for Valdosta State University.

High school & college
Leggett attended and played football at Mount Zion High School in Jonesboro, Georgia. He played running back during high school. His jersey from the school was retired in 2009. He attended Valdosta State University and played on their football team, the Blazers, helping them win two Division II National Championships; in 2004 and 2007. He was honored with first-team All-Gulf South honors in 2006 as well.

Professional career

Kansas City Chiefs
Leggett was undrafted in the 2008 NFL Draft, and signed with the Kansas City Chiefs (NFL) on May 2, 2008 as an undrafted free agent. After a productive rookie season, he was awarded the Mack Lee Hill Award for Most Outstanding Rookie for the Chiefs. Leggett was the first undrafted rookie to win the award. In November 2009, he was placed in injured reserve for a shoulder injury. In 2010, he was again placed on injured reserve, and was eventually not resigned.

Detroit Lions
On July 29, 2011, Leggett signed with the Detroit Lions. He was released on August 17, after his injury didn't heal.

Utah Blaze
Leggett signed with the Utah Blaze of the Arena Football League (AFL) in 2013 to resume his football career. He had 69 tackles and five interceptions playing in 15 games during his only season in the AFL.

Philadelphia Soul
During the offseason, Leggett signed with the Philadelphia Soul, but never played with the team.

Winnipeg Blue Bombers
In 2014, Leggett signed with the Winnipeg Blue Bombers of the Canadian Football League. In his first CFL year, Leggett was Winnipeg's nominee for the CFL outstanding defensive player of the year award. He finished his first CFL season tied for second in the league with five interceptions, including three in one game. At the end of the season, he was rewarded with a three-year contract extension. Leggett continued his strong play in 2015, contributing 59 tackles (including five on special teams), five quarterback sacks and one interception.

In 2016, Leggett was voted Winnipeg's top defensive player, and was the CFL's co-leader with seven interceptions, three of which he returned for touchdowns.

In 2017, Leggett was named a "Shaw CFL Top Performer of the Week" after scoring two touchdowns in the Banjo Bowl win over the Saskatchewan Roughriders. It was only the third time in the past 30 years that a CFL defensive player had multiple touchdowns in a game. On October 15, 2017, nearing the end of the 2017 regular season, Leggett suffered a torn Achilles tendon and was declared out for the rest of the season. In 13 games he had contributed 50 tackles, three interceptions and three sacks. In February 2018, less than a week before becoming a free agent, Leggett and the Bombers agreed to a one-year contract extension. Leggett suffered another serious injury during the 2018 CFL season and was carted off the team's practice field on October 22, 2018. Leggett was released by the Winnipeg Blue Bombers on November 21, 2018, after the Bombers were eliminated from the playoffs.

Albany Empire
Leggett returned to the Arena Football League when he signed with the Albany Empire in time for the final regular season game. After advancing in the playoffs, Leggett recorded Albany's first points in ArenaBowl XXXII when he intercepted a pass and returned it 54 yards for a touchdown. Leggett also recovered a fumble en route to Albany's first championship. The league folded in November 2019.

Statistics

Personal life
Leggett has a son, Malik Price, born in 2007. He participates in ballet, performing with the Royal Winnipeg Ballet in a performance of The Nutcracker. Leggett has been a fan of ballet since taking a ballet class in high school. He also has interest in opera and frequently listens to classical music. Leggett majored in criminal justice in college, and also studied voice and piano. He cites Ed Reed and Ray Lewis as his inspirations in football.

References

External links
 Maurice Leggett Official Site
 Winnipeg Blue Bombers bio 
 Kansas City Chiefs bio

1986 births
Living people
Sportspeople from McKeesport, Pennsylvania
Players of American football from Pennsylvania
American football cornerbacks
Valdosta State Blazers football players
Kansas City Chiefs players
Detroit Lions players
Utah Blaze players
Philadelphia Soul players
Albany Empire (AFL) players
American players of Canadian football
Canadian football defensive backs
Winnipeg Blue Bombers players